The 2022 Hamburg Sea Devils season is going to be the second season of the Hamburg Sea Devils team in the European League of Football, the second season with head coach Charles "Yogi" Jones and the first in the new Western Conference, having no games against the rivals Leipzig Kings and Panthers Wrocław. The Sea Devils are looking for the league title after two seasons reaching the championship game without a win.

Preseason
Shortly after the loss in the Championship Game 2022, the two defensive cornerstones Miguel Book and Kasim Edebali left the organization. Other defensive and offensive talent left the franchise to other teams in the ELF or to the Orlando Guardians of the resurrected XFL.
The first big signing of the new season came with Preston Haire, OBU Bison Quarterback and participant of the New Orleans Saints minicamp.

Regular season

Standings

Roster

Staff

Notes

References 

Hamburg Sea Devils (ELF) seasons
Hamburg Sea Devils
Hamburg Sea Devils